Leontopodium stracheyi is a species of plant in the family Asteraceae. It is native to China, Bhutan, India and Nepal.

References

stracheyi